The third season of The Sing-Off premiered on September 19, 2011. The number of a cappella groups was increased from 10 to 16, resulting in a new format. The show created two brackets, with only half the groups performing each week for the first few weeks. Nick Lachey stayed as host for the new season, as did Ben Folds and Shawn Stockman as judges. New to the judges' table was Sara Bareilles, who replaces Nicole Scherzinger, who left after 2 seasons to become a judge on The X Factor. Deke Sharon returned as music director and vocal producer. The music staff included Ed Boyer, Ben Bram, Rob Dietz, and Christopher Diaz. The program ran for 11 episodes, and concluded on November 28, 2011 with Pentatonix winning the title.

Groups

Elimination Table

Performances

Episode 1
Theme: Contestants' choice
Group performance: "Fuckin' Perfect" by Pink

Episode 2
Theme: Contestants' choice
Group performance: "Sing" by My Chemical Romance

* For this episode, only the song by Pentatonix appears to have had any significant iTunes sales.

Episode 3
Theme: Radio Hits (first round), 60's Classics (second round)
Group performance: "Somewhere Only We Know" by Keane

* For this episode, only the top three songs appear to have differed significantly from the others in iTunes sales.

Episode 4
Theme: Radio Hits (first round), 60's Classics (second round)
Group performance: "Rhythm of Love" by Plain White T's

Episode 5

Theme: Guilty pleasures
Group performance: "All Night Long (All Night)" by Lionel Richie*

* This song marks the biggest performance in television history.

Episode 6
Theme: Hip-Hop
Group performance: "Nothin' on You" by B.o.B featuring Bruno Mars

Episode 7
Theme: Superstar medleys
Group performance: Halloween medley of "This Is Halloween" by Danny Elfman, "Werewolves of London" by Warren Zevon and "Ghostbusters" by Ray Parker Jr.
Guest performance: Chris Brown medley by Committed

Episode 8
Theme: Rock classics (first round), Country hits (second round)
Group performance: "Wake Up" by Arcade Fire

Episode 9
Theme: R&B Current Hits (first round), R&B Classics (second round)
Group performance: R&B medley of "I Got You (I Feel Good)" by James Brown, "ABC" by The Jackson 5 and "Crazy in Love" by Beyoncé feat. Jay-Z

Episode 10
Theme: Master Mix (combining 2 songs from different artists) (first round), Judges' Choice (second round)
Group performance: Master Mix: "Bitter Sweet Symphony" by The Verve, "Hollaback Girl" by Gwen Stefani, "Baba O'Riley" by The Who, and "Last Friday Night (T.G.I.F.)" by Katy Perry

Episode 11
Group performance: "The Way You Make Me Feel" by Michael Jackson
Closing performance: "Happy Christmas (War is Over)" by John Lennon and Yoko Ono (sung by 14 a cappella groups: most were from the show's second season)

Ratings

US Nielsen ratings

References

External links
 
 

2011 American television seasons